The Greenwich+Docklands International Festival (GDIF) is a free annual outdoor performing arts festival, which takes place across East (Tower Hamlets) and South East London (Greenwich) every June. GDIF was founded by its Artistic Director Bradley Hemmings as an independent festival in 1996 and is produced by the charitable organisation Greenwich+Docklands Festivals (GDF). The festival organises over 200 performances during 10 days, which are attended by over 80,000 people each year.

Founding

The Greenwich+Docklands International Festival was founded by its Artistic Director Bradley Hemmings as an independent festival in 1996. The Festival developed out of the former Greenwich Festival into a cross-river festival.

Hemmings also performed as Co-Artistic Director of the Paralympic Opening Ceremony 2012 in London together with Jenny Sealey from Graeae Theatre Company.

Festival programme 
The festival produces site-specific outdoor theatre in public urban spaces in Greenwich and Tower Hamlets. Performances include small to large-scale theatrical and acrobatic shows by national and international artists. GDIF has a tradition of presenting spectacular shows such as Graeae's and La Fura dels Baus' Prometheus Awakes (2012; Spain/UK),  Compagnie Off's Les Girafes (2011; France), Free Art's Voala (2010; Spain),  Close Act's Pi-Leau (2009; Netherlands), Periplum's and The World Famous's The Bell (2008; UK), Strange Fruit's Absolute Pearl (2007; Australia).

GDIF also features Dancing City, an annual celebration of contemporary dance in the urban environment of Canary Wharf. Dancing City is part of the international Dancing Cities network.

With its productions and commissions the festival highlights the relation between people and places and draws attention to themes such as regeneration, climate change, and social integration.
GDIF is one of the frontrunners in making outdoor theatre accessible to as many people as possible, including performers and spectators. The festival also sets out to re-animate abandoned or neglected urban spaces. An example is the presentation of Frauke Requardt's and David Rosenberg's Motor Show on Greenwich Peninsula in 2012 or Wired Aerial's As The World Tipped in Mile End Park in 2011.

Two of the shows produced for GDIF2012, Prometheus Awakes and Crow) and GDF's production of Close Act's Pi-Leau in Hastings (23 June 2012) were part of the London 2012 Festival, the Cultural Olympiad accompanying the Olympic Games in London. GDIF takes place in Greenwich and Tower Hamlets, both Olympic host boroughs.

Collaborations 
The Festival is part of The Greenwich Festivals and Without Walls, and regularly collaborates with various Catalan artistic groups (i.e. La Fura dels Baus (2012), Fet a Ma (2011), Free Art (2010)).

Showcasing outdoor performing arts 

Since 2011 the festival also hosts London's annual showcase of outdoor theatre with over 150 national and international delegates attending and up to 40 companies presenting. The list of companies showcasing at GDIF 2012 included:

 11:18
 BiDiNG TiME
 Chadwick Song Theatre]
 Circ Pànic
 Circus Diaspora
 curious directive
 Dans La Poche
 D'irque & Fien
 Gijs van Bon
 Graeae

 Handspring Puppet Company UK
 High Hearted Theatre
 Inua Ellams
 Itinerània
 Kazzum
 La Fura dels Baus
 Les Enfants Terribles
 Ljud
 Low
 Marco Neri & Luca Regina
 Mimbre

 nabokov
 Orange
 PanGottic Circus-Theatre
 Plunge Boom
 RashDash
 Requardt & Rosenberg
 Sarruga
 StopGAP Dance Company
 tangled feet
 Whalley Range All Stars

Gallery

Perception (national press) 
National press describes GDIF as a key arts event in London’s cultural agenda  which is widely perceived as an invaluable contribution to the general “happiness" of the people of London.
The Sunday Times said that GDIF is the "high-octane 21st-century vengeance" of the Dickensian Greenwich Fair, featuring "heart-stopping circus" and a "whirling, tumbling riot of physical theatre."
The Guardian said: "The Greenwich+Docklands International Festival brings so much spectacle to the streets with its nine days of free events you could be forgiven for thinking you're hallucinating."
The Telegraph said "reliably engaging and innovative, the Greenwich and Docklands International Festival fuses theatre, dance, art and music to create a ten-day-long cultural spectacular."
Time Out said about GDIF2012: “One of London’s greatest free cultural events."
A Younger Theatre said about GDIF "this is street theatre at its best: epic, emotive and full of surprises."

Funding 
GDF is core funded by The Royal Borough of Greenwich, Tower Hamlets Council and Arts Council England.

Partnerships

Without Walls consortium 
 Greenwich+Docklands International Festival 
 award.io
 Brighton Festival
 Mintfest
 Norfolk & Norwich Festival
 Ageas Salisbury International Arts Festival
 Stockton International Riverside Festival
 Winchester Hat Fair
 XTRAX
 Watford Palace Theatre
 Lyric Hammersmith
 Latitude Festival

Catalan culture
 Institut Ramon Llull
 Catalan Arts!
 Fira Tarrega

References

External links 
 
 Official GDIF website

GDIF videos
 GDIF2012 highlights
 GDIF2011 highlights
 GDIF2012 highlights
 GDIF2009 highlights

Theatre festivals in England
Street theatre
Performing arts in London
Dance festivals in the United Kingdom
Festivals in London
Recurring events established in 1996
Tourist attractions in the Royal Borough of Greenwich
Tourist attractions in the London Borough of Tower Hamlets